Mahkum is an adaptation of Innocent Defendant, a South Korean series signed by MF Yapım, and is a Turkish television series in the action and drama genre, the first episode of which was released on December 14, 2021.

Production 
The most watched TV series on the screens in a short time, Mahkum, was adapted from the 2017 South Korean TV series Innocent Defendant.

Cast

Main Cast

Supporting cast

Departed characters

See also 
 Television in Turkey
 List of Turkish television series
 Turkish television drama

References 
 Mahkum oyuncuları! Mahkum dizisi hangi gün, konusu nedir, uyarlama mı?
 FOX, Mahkum dizisi
 https://m.imdb.com/title/tt14898744/

External links 
 Mahkum at IMDb
 Official website

Turkish television series
2021 Turkish television series debuts
Turkish-language television shows